The Arabic word nisba (also transcribed as nisbah or nisbat) may refer to:
 Nisba, a suffix used to form adjectives in Arabic grammar, or the adjective resulting from this formation
comparatively, in Afro-Asiatic: see Afroasiatic_languages#nisba
 Nisba (onomastics), a nisba used as an element in an Arabic name